Armand Putzeyse (30 November 1916 – 21 November 2003) was a cyclist from  Belgium. He won the bronze medal in the team road race at the 1936 Summer Olympics along with Auguste Garrebeek and François Vandermotte.

References

1916 births
2003 deaths
Belgian male cyclists
Olympic cyclists of Belgium
Olympic bronze medalists for Belgium
Cyclists at the 1936 Summer Olympics
Olympic medalists in cycling
Medalists at the 1936 Summer Olympics
Cyclists from Liège Province
People from Engis
20th-century Belgian people